Three-time defending champion Esther Vergeer defeated Korie Homan in a rematch of the previous year's final, 6–4, 6–2 to win the women's singles wheelchair tennis title at the 2009 Australian Open.

Seeds

 Esther Vergeer (champion)
 Korie Homan (final)

Draw

Finals

Wheelchair Women's Singles
2009 Women's Singles